Frederick "Fred" Peralta (born October 8, 1945) is an American politician who served as a member of the New Mexico House of Representatives for the 42nd district from 1987 to 1994.

Career 
Peralta was born in San Francisco on October 8, 1945 but moved to New Mexico two months later. He graduated from Taos High School before studying at the Aquinas Institute in River Forest, Illinois. Peralta served on the Taos Planning and Zoning Commission from 1974 to 1984 as well as the Taos Historical Commission from 1980 to 1984.

As a member of the New Mexico House of Representatives, Peralta served concurrently as the mayor of Taos from 1994 to 2003. He was also a member of the Taos City Council. During the administration of Governor Bill Richardson, Peralta served as secretary of the New Mexico Tourism Department and manager of the New Mexico State Fair. Peralta is the namesake of Fred Peralta Hall, a building on the University of New Mexico–Taos campus.

References 

Living people
1945 births
New Mexico Democrats
New Mexico Independents
Members of the New Mexico House of Representatives
People from Taos, New Mexico
People from Taos County, New Mexico
20th-century American politicians
21st-century American politicians
Mayors of places in New Mexico
Politicians from San Francisco